Life's a Bitch may refer to:

Life's a Bitch (album), a 1987 album by Raven
"Life's a Bitch" (song), a 1994 song by Nas from his album Illmatic
"Life's a Bitch", a 1999 song by Shooter from the Songs from Dawson's Creek soundtrack
Life's a Bitch (film), a 2013 Canadian short film

See also
Isn't Life a Bitch?, a 1931 French film by director Jean Renoir